This is a list of political entities that existed between 201 and 300 AD.
Political entities in the 2nd century – Political entities in the 4th century – Political entities by year

Sovereign states

See also
List of Bronze Age states
List of Iron Age states
List of Classical Age states
List of states during Late Antiquity
List of states during the Middle Ages

References

+03
3rd century
3rd century-related lists